José Aguirre may refer to:

 José Antonio Aguirre (politician) (1904–1960), first Basque president (lehendakari), footballer for Athletic Bilbao
 José Antonio Aguirre (early Californian) (1799–1860), Spanish-born merchant and rancher in Alta California
 José Antonio Aguirre (boxer) (born 1975), Mexican boxer
 José Joaquín Aguirre (1822–1901), Chilean medic, politician and educator
 José María Aguirre (died 1896), Cuban soldier in the Cuban War of Independence
 José Aguirre (cyclist) (born 1994), Mexican track cyclist
 José Luis Aguirre (born 1967), Spanish rower

See also
 José Antonio Aguirre (disambiguation)